is a former Japanese football player. She played for Japan national team.

Club career
Takahashi was born in Osaka Prefecture on April 11, 1976. After graduating from high school, she joined Nikko Securities Dream Ladies in 1995. The club won L.League championship for 3 years in a row (1996-1998). However, the club was disbanded in 1998 due to financial strain. She moved to OKI FC Winds in 1999. The club was disbanded, so she moved to Urawa Reinas FC (later Urawa Reds) in 2000. She was selected Best Eleven in 2004. She retired end of 2009 season.

National team career
On March 29, 2005, when Takahashi was 28 years old, she debuted for Japan national team against Australia. She played 2 games for Japan in 2005.

National team statistics

References

1976 births
Living people
Association football people from Osaka Prefecture
Japanese women's footballers
Japan women's international footballers
Nadeshiko League players
Nikko Securities Dream Ladies players
OKI FC Winds players
Urawa Red Diamonds Ladies players
Women's association football midfielders